West Hawaii Today is a Kailua-Kona, Hawai'i based daily newspaper.  It is owned and published by Oahu Publications Inc, a subsidiary of Black Press.

History
West Hawaii Today began in 1962 as a special weekly edition of Hilo Tribune-Herald. Known as the Kona Tribune-Herald it continued in 1964 as a weekly.

From late 1964 until 1968, the paper published under the title Kona Weekly Tribune-Herald. It was started by Glenn and Sally Maitland

West Hawaii Today began publishing under its present title on July 31, 1968.

In 2014, the Hawaii Tribune-Herald and West Hawaii Today were sold by Stephens Media, LLC to Oahu Publications Inc.

Subsidiary publications 
 North Hawaii News, Waimea, HI    (Weekly, Thur.)

References

External links
West Hawaii Today official web site

Newspapers published in Hawaii
Hawaii (island)
Publications established in 1962
1962 establishments in Hawaii
Black Press newspapers